The Laughing Cow is a brand of processed cheese products made by Fromageries Bel since 1921, and in particular refers to the brand's most popular product, the spreadable wedge.

Description
The cheese is a blend of cream, milk, and fresh and aged cheeses, particularly comté, which are pasteurized to stop the ripening process. Versatile and portable because of its pasteurization process, Laughing Cow can remain unrefrigerated for a limited length of time. The archetypal Laughing Cow cheese comes wrapped in the individual serving-sized foiled wedges and they are packaged in a round, flat box. Consumers have to pull a little red thread around the box to open it and the foil packaging also features a red tab for opening. The company was founded in 1921. The Laughing Cow is available in these formats in different worldwide markets:
 Triangles, squares or rectangles in various flavors.
 Spreadable tubs and jars
 The Laughing Cow Dip & Crunch (or Pik & Croq in mainland Europe), previously named Cheez Dippers, which are snacks consisting of bread sticks and cheese spread, and these come in four varieties; original, light, hazelnut and pizza
 Slicing blocks of The Laughing Cow with a harder consistency like that of butter
 , pods of cheese spread to be eaten out of the pod with a spoon, especially for younger children
 Toastinette processed cheese slices, similar to Kraft Singles
 Bite-sized cubes, in various flavours and designed to be served as aperitifs at cocktail parties - which are called Cheez & Fun in many European countries, and also Snack Bites in the UK,  in France, Belgium and the Netherlands, PartyCubes in Canada, Mini Cubes in Australia and New Zealand, and Belcube in Japan and South Korea. They are produced in 24- or 48-cube boxes of one flavour, e.g. blue, ham, salmon, chili pepper and olive, or they are produced in 24- or 48-cube boxes of a particular theme, e.g., 'Cocktails du Monde', 'Petites Recettes', 'Tex-Mex' and 'Indian'.

Discontinued formats of The Laughing Cow include: 
 Giggles/Blop processed cheese pods for younger children
 Squeeze bottles
 Big Cheez Dipper (a larger version of Cheez Dippers)
 Cheez Double Dippers (which contained crispy bacon flavour bits in addition to bread sticks and cheese spread).

The Laughing Cow USA introduced a TV commercial in 2009 where the company introduced a new slogan, "Have you laughed today?". In 2010 they updated the brand's website to include cheese recipes.

Laughing Cow cheese is available in its original flavour, a light version with 7% fat, and an ultra-light version with 3% fat. In addition, flavoured versions of the cheese (such as ham, gruyère, garlic, paprika, mushroom, chèvre, bleu, hazelnut, pizza, jalapeño and onion) are also available in various markets worldwide.

Evolution of the brand
The Laughing Cow is a red and white cow depicted as being jovial, and almost always wearing ear tags that look like the round boxes the cheese comes in. In the trademark, the cow is said to have 'a hilarious expression'. Bel had made the original drawing himself, after seeing a travelling meat wagon during World War I called , a play on the word for Valkyrie. In the beginning the cow was not laughing, was not red and did not wear ear tags. This patent was the very first branded cheese product registered in France. In 1924, illustrator Benjamin Rabier edited the drawing into something more like the image that prevails today. The blue and white stripes around the box date from 1955. Since 1976 both ear-tag boxes have been shown with the top-side visible. Before that year consumers were shown a top and bottom side. The current logo uses the Droste effect, with the laughing cow appearing inside the ear tags.

Kiri (pronounced in the same way as ) is a separate brand that Bel established in 1966.

Worldwide popularity
The cheese has long been popular in the United Kingdom and Canada as a children's snack. The cheese has also been a constant, but hardly popular, product in the United States for a number of years. However, demand for the triangular wedges has increased significantly recently, since the light version of the product was suggested as a viable menu item to followers of the South Beach Diet. The question asked by the French,  ("Why is The Laughing Cow laughing?") has become synonymous with the product.
Groupe Bel announced plans to open a €13 million factory in Syria on October 2, 2005. This was the first such direct investment in that nation by a French food company.

The product is localized by name nearly everywhere it is sold:  
 The Laughing Cow in English-speaking countries, the rest of Canada, and 
  in German-speaking countries except Switzerland
  in Spanish-speaking countries
  in Portuguese-speaking countries
  in 
  in 
  in 
  in 
  in 
  in 
  in 
  in 
 ,  in 
  in 
  in 

  in 
  in 

  in 

  in the 
  in 
  in 
  in 
  in

Other associations 
  is the name of an EP by late 1980s Washington, D.C., punk band Rain with connection to Dischord Records.
  is the name of a 1982 EP by UK Anarchist Punk band Zounds.
  is the name of a finishing move in the 1994 video game Primal Rage. The character Vertigo will move up to an opponent and transform them into a cow, which makes a disconcerted moo as it runs away.
  ('The reading cow') is the children's book prize of the city of Zürich, and a children's book program in the Auvergne region of France.
 The Laughing Cow's mascot appears on the cover of the 2002 album Human by UK electronic musician Freeform.

See also

 Emmi AG - manufacturer of Swiss Knight brand of spreadable cheese wedges
 Dairylea (cheese) - Similar popular spreadable cheese in UK/Ireland
 Babybel - another internationally distributed snack-sized cheese product produced by Fromageries Bel

References

External links
 The Laughing Cow at The Bel Group's web site
 The Laughing Cow Brand site features cheese recipes and snack cheese information
 La Vache qui rit  official site 

French cheeses
Fictional cattle
Animal mascots
Processed cheese
Food advertising characters
Female characters in advertising
Mascots introduced in 1921
Brand name dairy products
Products introduced in 1921
Food and drink introduced in 1921